The Norwegian Military Officers' Association is a trade union in Norway, organized under the national Confederation of Vocational Unions.

It was founded in 1957 as a merger of various officers' associations. It had about 5,150 on-duty members in 2014.

Its headquarters are located in Oslo, and the leader is Jens Jahren. It publishes the magazine Offisersbladet.

See also
Norwegian Officers' Union

References

Official website 

Trade unions in Norway
Confederation of Vocational Unions
Organisations based in Oslo
Organizations established in 1957